Itziar Bakero Escudero (born 24 July 1969) is a Spanish former footballer who played as a midfielder for Añorga KKE in the former División de Honor, with which she won three championships and three national cups.
 She was a member of the Spain women's national team through the late 1980s and the first half of the 1990s.

Her brother José María was also an international footballer.

Honours
Añorga KKE
 Primera División: 1991–92, 1994–95, 1995–96
 Copa de la Reina: 1990, 1991, 1993

International goals

External links
 Profile at Txapeldunak.com

References

1969 births
Living people
Spanish women's footballers
Spain women's international footballers
Footballers from the Basque Country (autonomous community)
Primera División (women) players
Añorga KKE players
Footballers from Navarre
People from Norte de Aralar
Women's association football midfielders